FC Tyumen is a Russian football club based in Tyumen. The former member of the Russian Premier League now plays in the third-tier FNL 2.

The club was previously known as Geolog (in 1961–1963 and 1983–1991, meaning Geologist), Priboy (in 1964–1965, meaning Surf), Neftyanik (in 1966–1977, meaning Oiler), Stroitel (meaning Builder), Fakel (in 1980–1982, meaning Torch), Dinamo-Gazovik (in 1992–1996), SDYSOR-Sibnefteprovod (in 2003).

History

The club was founded in 1961 and played in the Soviet Class B (1961–1970), Second League (1971–1986), and First League (1987–1991). In 1992 Tyumen entered the newly formed Russian Premier League and finished last between 20 teams. In 1993 Tyumen won the eastern zone of the First Division and returned to the Premier League for another two seasons, achieving their best result in history in 1994 (12th position). After relegation in 1995 Tyumen once again won the First Division in 1996. In 1998 and 1999 Tyumen suffered two consecutive relegations, ending up in the Second Division. In 2000–2002, Tyumen played in the Second Division, finishing no lower than fourth. In 2003 the club refused to participate in the Second Division, instead fielding a youth team in the Amateur League. In 2004 the club fielded a senior team as well, winning the zonal tournament of the Amateur League, but declined promotion. After finishing first again in 2005, Tyumen returned to professional football and began to play in the Second Division. It won its zone of the Russian Professional Football League in 2013–14 season and was promoted to the second-level Russian National Football League. Despite finishing in the relegation zone at the end of the 2017–18 season, the club was not relegated as other clubs ahead in the standings failed to obtain the league license for 2018–19. On 20 March 2019, 6 points in the standings were taken from Tyumen for unpaid debts to former players Marat Shaymordanov, Sergei Shumeyko and Nikita Fursin. As a result, the club dropped from 18th place to 19th (both in relegation zone). The club was relegated to PFL at the end of the 2018–19 season.

Current squad
As of 22 February 2023, according to the official Second League website.

Out on loan

Reserve squad
Tyumen's reserve squad played professionally as FC Dynamo-Gazovik-d Tyumen in the Russian Third League in 1995–1996.

Tyumen Ultras
Tyumen fanaticism consists of 3 waves. The first wave came in the 1980s, the second wave in the early 1990s and the third wave the ultras began in 1998 and to this day. Fan online magazine.

Notable past players
Had international caps for their respective countries. Players whose name is listed in bold represented their countries while playing for Tyumen.

Russia/USSR
  Sergey Dmitriev
  Viktor Shishkin
  Yevgeni Sidorov
  Sergei Kolotovkin
  Aleksei Kosolapov
  Sergei Podpaly
  Vladimir Tatarchuk

Former USSR countries
  Stanislav Buchnev
  Arif Asadov
  Vyaçeslav Lıçkin
  Andrey Chukhley
  Pavel Radnyonak
  Valery Kichin
  Edgars Burlakovs
  Vadims Fjodorovs

  Emil Caras
  Yuri Baturenko
  Farkhod Vosiyev
  Yuriy Hrytsyna
  Ihor Kostiuk
  Ihor Kutepov
  Viktor Leonenko
  Oleksandr Pryzetko
  Dmytro Topchiev

References

External links
Official website 

 
Association football clubs established in 1961
Tyumen
Tyumen
1961 establishments in Russia